Iftikhar Ali Mushwani is a Pakistani politician hailing from Gujar Garhi Mardan District, who had been a member of the Khyber Pakhtunkhwa Assembly, belonging to the Pakistan Tehreek-e-Insaf. He served from May 2013 until May 2018 and again from August 2018 till January 2023. He also served as chairman and member of the different committees.

Political career
Iftikhar was elected as the member of the Khyber Pakhtunkhwa Assembly from PK-54(Mardan-VII) in 2013 Pakistani general election on ticket of Pakistan Tehreek-e-Insaf.

References

1977 births
Living people
Pashtun people
Khyber Pakhtunkhwa MPAs 2013–2018
People from Karak District
Pakistan Tehreek-e-Insaf MPAs (Khyber Pakhtunkhwa)